Cameron Jones (born 7 May 1996) is an Australian swimmer. He competed in the men's 50 metre freestyle event at the 2018 FINA World Swimming Championships (25 m), in Hangzhou, China.

References

External links
 

1996 births
Living people
Australian male freestyle swimmers
Place of birth missing (living people)
20th-century Australian people
21st-century Australian people